Bobby Blair may refer to:

Bobby Blair (footballer), Scottish footballer
Bobby Blair (tennis) (born 1964), American tennis player